Confession of a Murderer is a 1936 novel by the Austrian writer Joseph Roth. It has the subtitle Told in One Night (Erzählt in einer Nacht). The narrative focuses on a Russian exile, Golubchik, who tells what he claims is his life's story to a group of people, including Roth, in a restaurant in Paris.

Reception
James A. Snead of The New York Times wrote in 1985: "Roth's night-story implicitly identifies the twilight of the Austro-Hungarian Empire with Golubchik's private 'tragedy of banality.' His futile search for paternity, homeland and revenge, ranging over 'Old Europe' from Odessa to Paris, is an ambivalent elegy to a lost epoch. The double narration creates an air of evasiveness and manipulation that mirrors the intrigues of the state bureaucracies Golubchik encounters."

See also
 1936 in literature
 Austrian literature

References

External links
 Confession of a Murderer at Projekt Gutenberg-DE 

1936 German-language novels
Austrian novels
Novels by Joseph Roth
Novels set in Austria-Hungary
Novels set in the interwar period